Chopanimando is an important archaeological site, which indicates transition of humans from food gathering society to food production society. It is situated in Belan river valley in modern Allahabad district of Uttar Pradesh state, India. A three phase sequence of palaeolithic, Mesolithic, and Neolithic is attributed by archaeologists. Circular and oval settlement with hearths, hand-made cord-impressed pottery, and microliths, chalcedony are found here during excavation.

Excavation
It is located around 77 km from Allahabad at Bank of Belan river. The site is spread in 15000 sq km. The site was excavated in 1967 and 1977 by G.R Sharma. The excavation revealed Mesolithic and Neolithic settlement. Remains of pottery and rice have been found from 7000-6000 BCE.

References 

Allahabad district
Archaeological sites in Uttar Pradesh